Lawrence P. Casey (born November 8, 1940) is an American film and television actor. He is known for playing Private First Class Mark T. Hitchcock in the American adventure and drama television series The Rat Patrol.

Life and career 
Casey was born in New York. He was originally a construction worker and professional boxer. In 1959 he made his acting debut in the stage play The Visit. He made his screen debut in 1966 in the medical drama television series Dr. Kildare. Casey also guest-starred in an episode of the western television series Gunsmoke.

Casey joined the cast of the new ABC action and drama television series The Rat Patrol, playing driver PFC Mark T. Hitchcock. During the series Casey and Christopher George, who played Sgt. Sam Troy, toured Vietnam meeting American troops. After the series ended in 1968 Casey guest-starred in the western television series Bonanza and co-starred as Elliot Crane in the 1969 film The Gay Deceivers. 

Casey guest-starred in television programs including The Rockford Files, Ironside, The Love Boat, Knots Landing, Falcon Crest, The Mod Squad and Barnaby Jones. He played Rodney Harrington in the soap opera television series Return to Peyton Place. Casey appeared in films such as Good Guys Wear Black,  Acapulco Gold, The Student Nurses, The Great Waldo Pepper and Borderline. He retired in 1992, last appearing in the legal drama television series L.A. Law.

References

External links 

Rotten Tomatoes profile

1940 births
Living people
People from New York (state)
Male actors from New York (state)
American male film actors
American male stage actors
American male television actors
American male soap opera actors
20th-century American male actors
American male boxers